Roelof Koets, or Coets (1655–1725), was an 18th-century painter from the Northern Netherlands.

Biography
He was born in Zwolle as the son of Andries Koets and is known as a portrait painter and the teacher of the miniature painter Herman Wolters, the husband of Henriëtta van Pee. According to his biographer Johan van Gool, he had been a pupil of Gerard ter Borch and painted upwards of 5000 portraits of various gentry in Friesland and Overijssel, including portraits of the family of Hendrik Casimir. Though sometimes still life paintings are attributed to him, most of these are by an earlier Roelof Koets, who could possibly have been his descendant.
He died in Zwolle.

References

Roelof Koets the younger on Artnet

1655 births
1725 deaths
18th-century Dutch painters
18th-century Dutch male artists
Dutch male painters
People from Zwolle